Patrick Goots (born 10 April 1966) is a Belgian former professional footballer who played as a striker.

Club career
Goots was in the late 1980s, 90s and the beginning of the next decade, one of the best strikers in Belgium. At the level of the first division of the Belgian Pro League he scored a total of 156 goals. He was also remembered for his Ponytail hairstyle. His nickname was "Patje Bats Bats". He played at the highest level in Belgium until the age of 38 and in his last season in the Belgian Pro League he was the top scorer for Antwerp with eight goals. In the 2002–03 season, he scored two goals against Anderlecht in a 2–1 win.

Despite his goal-scoring ability, he never played for the Belgium national team.

In January 2009, Goots signed with fourth-tier side Thes Sport. In March 2009, due to a serious knee injury he was forced to retire and decided to start coaching-career.

Honours 
Lommel SK

 Belgian Third Division: 1986–87

Antwerp
 Belgian Second Division: 1999–2000

Individual
 Belgian Second Division top scorer: 1997–98, 1998–99, 1999–2000
 Goal of the Year: 2002

References

External links 

1966 births
Living people
People from Mol, Belgium
Belgian footballers
Association football forwards
Belgian Pro League players
Challenger Pro League players
K.F.C. Dessel Sport players
K.F.C. Lommel S.K. players
K. Beerschot V.A.C. players
K.V. Kortrijk players
K.R.C. Genk players
K.S.K. Beveren players
Sint-Truidense V.V. players
KFC Turnhout players
Royal Antwerp F.C. players
K.V. Mechelen players
K.V.V. Thes Sport Tessenderlo players
Footballers from Antwerp Province